Kanwal Naseer or Kanwal Hameed (January 23, 1943 – 25 March 2021) was a Pakistani journalist at Pakistan Television Network, having the honor of being Pakistan's first female news presenter and anchor.

Early life
Kanwal Naseer was born in 1948 in Lahore, Pakistan. Her mother Mohini Hameed was a broadcaster and actress.

Career
She made her first appearance for PTV on 26th November, 1964.
Kanwal made her media debut at the age of 6 or 7 on radio.
She worked for state-run Pakistan Television Corporation for nearly 50 years.
She was working on FM radio as well till her last.

Awards and recognition
In 2015, she was awarded the Pride of Performance by President of Pakistan.

Death
She died on March 25, 2021 in Islamabad, Pakistan after a brief illness.

References

1943 births
2021 deaths
Pakistani women
Recipients of the Pride of Performance
Journalists from Lahore